Kingswells is a village and suburb of Aberdeen, Scotland, situated west of the city and to the east of Westhill.

Kingswells has existed as a village for centuries, but only beginning in the 1980s did it expand as a result of the boom in the oil industry. Kingswells accommodates many facilities suited for everybody and is famous for its spacious family homes amongst a leafy, affluent setting. It has a wide range of local amenities including; a primary school, convenience store, doctor's surgery, veterinary surgery and two community halls. In the nearby mile radius, there is also a business complex with a hotel, home to a Starbucks and a luxury gym. It doesn't include a secondary school however, there are school buses which run within the community providing efficient transport to nearby neighbouring secondary schools such as Bucksburn Academy.

The village is served by regular bus services Monday to Friday (Park and Ride only at weekends); the 14 operates via the Aberdeen Royal Infirmary Hospital to the city and the new services of; 4, 5, 6, and 6A, which operate from the Park and Ride via Queens Road to the city. There are also services that operate to Countesswells, Westhill, Elrick and Alford (218). Kingswells also has easy access to Bridge of Don and Dyce via the AWPR, convenient for people working at the Airport and Industrial Estates.

References

External links
 Kingswells village web site

Areas of Aberdeen
Villages in Aberdeen